Book M is the third studio album by Secret Chiefs 3, released on 18 September 2001 by Web of Mimicry. Founding member Trevor Dunn appeared on only one song, due to scheduling conflicts with the metal supergroup Fantômas in which he also performs.

Reception

Blake Butler of AllMusic commended the production and musicianship of Book M, saying "the band proves that they command an amazing grip on their musical reigns, executing flawlessly tight arrangements, even if they are extremely peculiar." Sean Murphy of PopMatters called the album "a near-masterpiece and while it’s delightfully weird enough to scare off the amateurs, there is abundant joy to be found within."

Track listing

Personnel
Adapted from the Book M liner notes.

Secret Chiefs 3
 Danny Heifetz – drums (3, 5, 6, 9, 10, 11, 13), goblet drum (1, 4, 11, 12), riq (4, 11, 12), zills (5, 11, 12)
 Trey Spruance – production, engineering, keyboards (1, 2, 4-7, 9-13), bağlama (1, 4, 8, 12), guitar (2, 3, 5, 6, 7, 9-13), additional programming (2, 5, 7), electronics (2, 6, 8), Sympitar (3, 12), bass guitar (3, 13), tar (4, 8), trumpet (10, 13), organ (4, 6, 7), arrangements (3), electric guitar (4), twelve-string guitar (4), microtonal guitar (5), percussion (7), remixing (7), goblet drum (8), electric piano (10), zither (10), art direction, illustrations, design
 William Winant – tom drums (5), bass drum (8), cymbals (8), frame drum (8), sampler (9), zills (11), bells (12)

Additional musicians
 Trevor Dunn — bass guitar (9)
 Timb Harris — violin (1, 8, 11, 12), viola (8)
 Eyvind Kang – violin (3, 5, 6, 10, 13), cello (7)
 Fatima Khanoam – santur (1, 4, 11)
 Clinton "Bär" McKinnon – saxophone (10, 13)
 Jason Schimmel – mandolin (4), acoustic guitar (4)
 Danny Shamoun – goblet drum (1, 4), riq (1, 4)
 Tim Smolens – contrabass (1, 4, 11), cello (1, 11, 12), bass guitar (6)

Production and design
 Billy Anderson – engineering (1-8, 10-13)
 Thom Canova – mastering, recording (9)
 Earl Kluck – typesetting, design
 Mari Kono – illustrations, design

Release history

References

External links 
 Book M at Bandcamp
 

2001 albums
Secret Chiefs 3 albums
Web of Mimicry albums
Albums produced by Trey Spruance